Naturally occurring rhenium (75Re) is 37.4% 185Re, which is stable (although it is predicted to decay), and 62.6% 187Re, which is unstable but has a very long half-life (4.12×1010 years). Among elements with a known stable isotope, only indium and tellurium similarly occur with a stable isotope in lower abundance than the long-lived radioactive isotope.

There are 33 other unstable isotopes recognized, the longest-lived of which are 183Re with a half-life of 70 days, 184Re with a half-life of 38 days, 186Re with a half-life of 3.7186 days, 182Re with a half-life of 64.0 hours, and 189Re with a half-life of 24.3 hours. There are also numerous isomers, the longest-lived of which are 186mRe with a half-life of 200,000 years and 184mRe with a half-life of 177.25 days. All others have half-lives less than a day.

List of isotopes 

|-
| rowspan=2|160Re
| rowspan=2 style="text-align:right" | 75
| rowspan=2 style="text-align:right" | 85
| rowspan=2|159.98212(43)#
| rowspan=2|860(120) μs[0.82(+15−9) ms]
| p (91%)
| 159W
| rowspan=2|(2−)
| rowspan=2|
| rowspan=2|
|-
| α (9%)
| 156Ta
|-
| 161Re
| style="text-align:right" | 75
| style="text-align:right" | 86
| 160.97759(22)
| 0.37(4) ms
| p
| 160W
| 1/2+
|
|
|-
| style="text-indent:1em" | 161mRe
| colspan="3" style="text-indent:2em" | 123.8(13) keV
| 15.6(9) ms
| α
| 157Ta
| 11/2−
|
|
|-
| rowspan=2|162Re
| rowspan=2 style="text-align:right" | 75
| rowspan=2 style="text-align:right" | 87
| rowspan=2|161.97600(22)#
| rowspan=2|107(13) ms
| α (94%)
| 158Ta
| rowspan=2|(2−)
| rowspan=2|
| rowspan=2|
|-
| β+ (6%)
| 162W
|-
| rowspan=2 style="text-indent:1em" | 162mRe
| rowspan=2 colspan="3" style="text-indent:2em" | 173(10) keV
| rowspan=2|77(9) ms
| α (91%)
| 158Ta
| rowspan=2|(9+)
| rowspan=2|
| rowspan=2|
|-
| β+ (9%)
| 162W
|-
| rowspan=2|163Re
| rowspan=2 style="text-align:right" | 75
| rowspan=2 style="text-align:right" | 88
| rowspan=2|162.972081(21)
| rowspan=2|390(70) ms
| β+ (68%)
| 163W
| rowspan=2|(1/2+)
| rowspan=2|
| rowspan=2|
|-
| α (32%)
| 159Ta
|-
| rowspan=2 style="text-indent:1em" | 163mRe
| rowspan=2 colspan="3" style="text-indent:2em" | 115(4) keV
| rowspan=2|214(5) ms
| α (66%)
| 159Ta
| rowspan=2|(11/2−)
| rowspan=2|
| rowspan=2|
|-
| β+ (34%)
| 163W
|-
| rowspan=2|164Re
| rowspan=2 style="text-align:right" | 75
| rowspan=2 style="text-align:right" | 89
| rowspan=2|163.97032(17)#
| rowspan=2|0.53(23) s
| α (58%)
| 160Ta
| rowspan=2|high
| rowspan=2|
| rowspan=2|
|-
| β+ (42%)
| 164W
|-
| style="text-indent:1em" | 164mRe
| colspan="3" style="text-indent:2em" | 120(120)# keV
| 530(230) ms
|
|
| (2#)−
|
|
|-
| rowspan=2|165Re
| rowspan=2 style="text-align:right" | 75
| rowspan=2 style="text-align:right" | 90
| rowspan=2|164.967089(30)
| rowspan=2|1# s
| β+
| 165W
| rowspan=2|1/2+#
| rowspan=2|
| rowspan=2|
|-
| α
| 161Ta
|-
| rowspan=2 style="text-indent:1em" | 165mRe
| rowspan=2 colspan="3" style="text-indent:2em" | 47(26) keV
| rowspan=2|2.1(3) s
| β+ (87%)
| 165W
| rowspan=2|11/2−#
| rowspan=2| 
| rowspan=2|
|-
| α (13%)
| 161Ta
|-
| rowspan=2|166Re
| rowspan=2 style="text-align:right" | 75
| rowspan=2 style="text-align:right" | 91
| rowspan=2|165.96581(9)#
| rowspan=2|2# s
| β+
| 166W
| rowspan=2|2−#
| rowspan=2|
| rowspan=2|
|-
| α
| 162Ta
|-
| rowspan=2|167Re
| rowspan=2 style="text-align:right" | 75
| rowspan=2 style="text-align:right" | 92
| rowspan=2|166.96260(6)#
| rowspan=2|3.4(4) s
| α
| 163Ta
| rowspan=2|9/2−#
| rowspan=2|
| rowspan=2|
|-
| β+
| 167W
|-
| rowspan=2 style="text-indent:1em" | 167mRe
| rowspan=2 colspan="3" style="text-indent:2em" | 130(40)# keV
| rowspan=2|5.9(3) s
| β+ (99.3%)
| 167W
| rowspan=2|1/2+#
| rowspan=2|
| rowspan=2|
|-
| α (.7%)
| 163Ta
|-
| rowspan=2|168Re
| rowspan=2 style="text-align:right" | 75
| rowspan=2 style="text-align:right" | 93
| rowspan=2|167.96157(3)
| rowspan=2|4.4(1) s
| β+ (99.99%)
| 168W
| rowspan=2|(5+, 6+, 7+)
| rowspan=2|
| rowspan=2|
|-
| α (.005%)
| 164Ta
|-
| style="text-indent:1em" | 168mRe
| colspan="3" style="text-indent:2em" | non-exist
| 6.6(15) s
|
|
|
|
|
|-
| rowspan=2|169Re
| rowspan=2 style="text-align:right" | 75
| rowspan=2 style="text-align:right" | 94
| rowspan=2|168.95879(3)
| rowspan=2|8.1(5) s
| β+ (99.99%)
| 169W
| rowspan=2|9/2−#
| rowspan=2|
| rowspan=2|
|-
| α (.005%)
| 165Ta
|-
| rowspan=2 style="text-indent:1em" | 169mRe
| rowspan=2 colspan="3" style="text-indent:2em" | 145(29) keV
| rowspan=2|15.1(15) s
| β+ (99.8%)
| 169W
| rowspan=2|1/2+#
| rowspan=2|
| rowspan=2|
|-
| α (.2%)
| 164Ta
|-
| rowspan=2|170Re
| rowspan=2 style="text-align:right" | 75
| rowspan=2 style="text-align:right" | 95
| rowspan=2|169.958220(28)
| rowspan=2|9.2(2) s
| β+ (99.99%)
| 170W
| rowspan=2|(5+)
| rowspan=2|
| rowspan=2|
|-
| α (.01%)
| 166Ta
|-
| 171Re
| style="text-align:right" | 75
| style="text-align:right" | 96
| 170.95572(3)
| 15.2(4) s
| β+
| 171W
| (9/2−)
|
|
|-
| 172Re
| style="text-align:right" | 75
| style="text-align:right" | 97
| 171.95542(6)
| 15(3) s
| β+
| 172W
| (5)
|
|
|-
| style="text-indent:1em" | 172mRe
| colspan="3" style="text-indent:2em" | 0(100)# keV
| 55(5) s
| β+
| 172W
| (2)
|
|
|-
| 173Re
| style="text-align:right" | 75
| style="text-align:right" | 98
| 172.95324(3)
| 1.98(26) min
| β+
| 173W
| (5/2−)
|
|
|-
| 174Re
| style="text-align:right" | 75
| style="text-align:right" | 99
| 173.95312(3)
| 2.40(4) min
| β+
| 174W
|
|
|
|-
| 175Re
| style="text-align:right" | 75
| style="text-align:right" | 100
| 174.95138(3)
| 5.89(5) min
| β+
| 175W
| (5/2−)
|
|
|-
| 176Re
| style="text-align:right" | 75
| style="text-align:right" | 101
| 175.95162(3)
| 5.3(3) min
| β+
| 176W
| 3+
|
|
|-
| 177Re
| style="text-align:right" | 75
| style="text-align:right" | 102
| 176.95033(3)
| 14(1) min
| β+
| 177W
| 5/2−
|
|
|-
| style="text-indent:1em" | 177mRe
| colspan="3" style="text-indent:2em" | 84.71(10) keV
| 50(10) μs
|
|
| 5/2+
|
|
|-
| 178Re
| style="text-align:right" | 75
| style="text-align:right" | 103
| 177.95099(3)
| 13.2(2) min
| β+
| 178W
| (3+)
|
|
|-
| 179Re
| style="text-align:right" | 75
| style="text-align:right" | 104
| 178.949988(26)
| 19.5(1) min
| β+
| 179W
| (5/2)+
|
|
|-
| style="text-indent:1em" | 179m1Re
| colspan="3" style="text-indent:2em" | 65.39(9) keV
| 95(25) μs
|
|
| (5/2−)
|
|
|-
| style="text-indent:1em" | 179m2Re
| colspan="3" style="text-indent:2em" | 1684.59(14)+Y keV
| >0.4 μs
|
|
| (23/2+)
|
|
|-
| 180Re
| style="text-align:right" | 75
| style="text-align:right" | 105
| 179.950789(23)
| 2.44(6) min
| β+
| 180W
| (1)−
|
|
|-
| 181Re
| style="text-align:right" | 75
| style="text-align:right" | 106
| 180.950068(14)
| 19.9(7) h
| β+
| 181W
| 5/2+
|
|
|-
| 182Re
| style="text-align:right" | 75
| style="text-align:right" | 107
| 181.95121(11)
| 64.0(5) h
| β+
| 182W
| 7+
|
|
|-
| style="text-indent:1em" | 182m1Re
| colspan="3" style="text-indent:2em" | 60(100) keV
| 12.7(2) h
| β+
| 182W
| 2+
|
|
|-
| style="text-indent:1em" | 182m2Re
| colspan="3" style="text-indent:2em" | 235.736(10)+X keV
| 585(21) ns
|
|
| 2−
|
|
|-
| style="text-indent:1em" | 182m3Re
| colspan="3" style="text-indent:2em" | 461.3(1)+X keV
| 0.78(9) μs
|
|
| (4−)
|
|
|-
| 183Re
| style="text-align:right" | 75
| style="text-align:right" | 108
| 182.950820(9)
| 70.0(14) d
| EC
| 183W
| 5/2+
|
|
|-
| style="text-indent:1em" | 183mRe
| colspan="3" style="text-indent:2em" | 1907.6(3) keV
| 1.04(4) ms
| IT
| 183Re
| (25/2+)
|
|
|-
| 184Re
| style="text-align:right" | 75
| style="text-align:right" | 109
| 183.952521(5)
| 35.4(7) d
| β+
| 184W
| 3(−)
|
|
|-
| rowspan=2 style="text-indent:1em" | 184mRe
| rowspan=2 colspan="3" style="text-indent:2em" | 188.01(4) keV
| rowspan=2|177.25(7) d
| IT (75.4%)
| 184Re
| rowspan=2|8(+)
| rowspan=2|
| rowspan=2|
|-
| β+ (24.6%)
| 184W
|-
| 185Re
| style="text-align:right" | 75
| style="text-align:right" | 110
| 184.9529550(13)
| colspan=3 align=center|Observationally Stable
| 5/2+
| 0.3740(2)
|
|-
| style="text-indent:1em" | 185mRe
| colspan="3" style="text-indent:2em" | 2124(2) keV
| 123(23) ns
|
|
| (21/2)
|
|
|-
| rowspan=2|186Re
| rowspan=2 style="text-align:right" | 75
| rowspan=2 style="text-align:right" | 111
| rowspan=2|185.9549861(13)
| rowspan=2|3.7186(5) d
| β− (93.1%)
| 186Os
| rowspan=2|1−
| rowspan=2|
| rowspan=2|
|-
| EC (6.9%)
| 186W
|-
| rowspan=2 style="text-indent:1em" | 186mRe
| rowspan=2 colspan="3" style="text-indent:2em" | 149(7) keV
| rowspan=2|2.0(5)×105 y
| IT (90%)
| 186Re
| rowspan=2|(8+)
| rowspan=2|
| rowspan=2|
|-
| β− (10%)
| 186Os
|-
| 187Re
| style="text-align:right" | 75
| style="text-align:right" | 112
| 186.9557531(15)
| 41.2(2)×109 y
| β−
| 187Os
| 5/2+
| 0.6260(2)
| 
|-
| 188Re
| style="text-align:right" | 75
| style="text-align:right" | 113
| 187.9581144(15)
| 17.0040(22) h
| β−
| 188Os
| 1−
|
|
|-
| style="text-indent:1em" | 188mRe
| colspan="3" style="text-indent:2em" | 172.069(9) keV
| 18.59(4) min
| IT
| 188Re
| (6)−
|
|
|-
| 189Re
| style="text-align:right" | 75
| style="text-align:right" | 114
| 188.959229(9)
| 24.3(4) h
| β−
| 189Os
| 5/2+
|
|
|-
| 190Re
| style="text-align:right" | 75
| style="text-align:right" | 115
| 189.96182(16)
| 3.1(3) min
| β−
| 190Os
| (2)−
|
|
|-
| rowspan=2 style="text-indent:1em" | 190mRe
| rowspan=2 colspan="3" style="text-indent:2em" | 210(50) keV
| rowspan=2|3.2(2) h
| β− (54.4%)
| 190Os
| rowspan=2|(6−)
| rowspan=2|
| rowspan=2|
|-
| IT (45.6%)
| 190Re
|-
| 191Re
| style="text-align:right" | 75
| style="text-align:right" | 116
| 190.963125(11)
| 9.8(5) min
| β−
| 191Os
| (3/2+, 1/2+)
|
|
|-
| 192Re
| style="text-align:right" | 75
| style="text-align:right" | 117
| 191.96596(21)#
| 16(1) s
| β−
| 192Os
|
|
|
|-
| 193Re
| style="text-align:right" | 75
| style="text-align:right" | 118
| 192.96747(21)#
| 30# s [>300 ns]
|
|
| 5/2+#
|
|
|-
| 194Re
| style="text-align:right" | 75
| style="text-align:right" | 119
| 193.97042(32)#
| 2# s [>300 ns]
|
|
|
|
|

Rhenium-186

Radiopharmaceutical.

References 

 Isotope masses from:

 Isotopic compositions and standard atomic masses from:

 Half-life, spin, and isomer data selected from the following sources.

 
Rhenium
Rhenium